The American Encaustic Tiling Company was founded in New York, New York in 1875, later establishing a factory in Zanesville, Ohio, in 1892. Their tiles were intended to compete with the English tiles that were selling in the United States for use in fireplaces and other architectural locations. The first glazed tiles were made in 1880 and embossed tiles were made in 1881. By 1890, they were the largest tile company in the world, and the small town of Zanesville nearly tripled in size over a thirty-year period as more people found work with the company. The firm closed in 1935 and was then reopened in 1937 as the Shawnee Pottery.

Their tiles form a mural at the Borden's Dairy Factory at 2840 Atlantic Avenue in East New York.

Gallery

References

Ceramics manufacturers of the United States
1875 establishments in Ohio
1935 disestablishments in the United States
American companies established in 1875